Tom Ellis Hooson (16 March 1933 – 8 May 1985) was a British Conservative Party politician.

Personal life and background
Hooson was the cousin (and political opponent) of Emlyn Hooson, former Liberal Party MP for Montgomeryshire.

Hooson was educated at Rhyl Grammar School, University College, Oxford and Gray's Inn. Before entering politics, he was as a journalist for The Times, and later worked in publishing and advertising, becoming a senior vice president with Benton & Bowles.

Political career
He first stood for Parliament at Caernarvon in 1959, but was beaten by Labour's Goronwy Roberts. He was a chairman of the Bow Group.

He was Member of Parliament (MP) in the United Kingdom for Brecon and Radnor. He gained the seat from Labour in 1979, and held it until he died from cancer at his home in Chelsea, London on 8 May 1985, aged 52. The Liberals won the resulting by-election by a narrow margin of 559 votes over Labour.

References

The Times Guide to the House of Commons, Times Newspapers Ltd, 1979 & 1983

External links 
 

1933 births
1985 deaths
20th-century British journalists
20th-century Welsh businesspeople
Alumni of University College, Oxford
British publishers (people)
British advertising executives
Conservative Party (UK) MPs for Welsh constituencies
Deaths from cancer in England
Members of Gray's Inn
Members of the Bow Group
Place of birth missing
UK MPs 1979–1983
UK MPs 1983–1987
The Times journalists